The Maysville and Lexington Railroad, Northern Division, was a 19th-century railway company in north-central Kentucky in the United States. In 1868, along with the Southern Division, it restored the service of the earlier Maysville & Lexington line, which had failed in 1856. The Northern Division was not as successful as the Southern and failed in 1875, after which it was reörganized as the "North Division".

See also
 List of Kentucky railroads

Defunct Kentucky railroads
Defunct companies based in Kentucky
Railway companies established in 1868
Railway companies disestablished in 1875
1868 establishments in Kentucky
1875 disestablishments in Kentucky
American companies disestablished in 1875
American companies established in 1868